Lieutenant Commander Eugene Esmonde,  (1 March 1909 – 12 February 1942) was a distinguished Irish pilot in the Fleet Air Arm who was posthumously awarded the Victoria Cross (VC), the highest award for gallantry in the face of the enemy awarded to members of Commonwealth forces. Esmonde earned this award while in command of a British Fleet Air Arm torpedo bomber squadron in the Second World War - in an action known as Operation Fuller, the 'Channel Dash’.

Early life
Esmonde was born on 1 March 1909 in Thurgoland, Yorkshire, near Barnsley. His mother, Eily O’Sullivan, was his father's second wife, Dr John Joseph Esmonde (1862–1915), had married her in 1904, after his first wife died in 1901. Dr. Esmonde was an Irish Catholic, a former Irish MP, who was in general practice in Yorkshire. 

Esmonde had six natural siblings (including a town brother) and six half-siblings - three male, three female - from his father's first marriage to Rose McGuinness. The natural siblings were: Owen, Donal, John Witham, his twin James, Carmel and Patrick. His half-brothers were: Sir John Esmonde, 14th Baronet, who served in the First World War; Second Lieutenant Geoffrey Esmonde (1897–1916), who was killed in action in the First World War serving with the 26th Tyneside Irish Battalion of the Northumberland Fusiliers; and Sir Anthony Esmonde, 15th Baronet. 

His father, died in 1915, when Esmonde and his siblings were all quite young. He had been serving in the Royal Army Medical Corps, and succumbed to pneumonia, after being laid low by over-work.

Though born in England, Esmonde's parents were from Ireland and the family returned to the Esmonde family's ancestral home - Esmonde baronets - in Drominagh, County Tipperary. He was educated by the Jesuits, first at Wimbledon College in London and then at Clongowes Wood College in County Kildare, Ireland.

Esmonde was commissioned into the Royal Air Force (RAF) as a pilot officer on probation on 28 December 1928. During the early 1930s, Esmonde served first in the RAF, and then transferred to the Fleet Air Arm where he served in the Mediterranean when responsibility for naval aviation was returned to the Royal Navy. Upon leaving the navy in 1934, he flew for Imperial Airways. and amongst other feats he flew flying boats and the first surcharged airmail to Australia.

Second World War

Early wartime career
At the start of the Second World War, he returned to the Fleet Air Arm with the rank of lieutenant commander. He returned to sea duty on board  after a series of postings to shore-based stations.

This attack took place after the Battle of the Denmark Strait, in which Bismarck sank . The biplanes flying from Victorious made a 193 km (120-mile) flight in foul North Atlantic weather and one torpedo hit the Bismarck amidships, leading either directly or indirectly through hard manoeuvring to earlier damage opening up, causing further flooding and a boiler room rendered unusable. The Commander-in-Chief of the Home Fleet wrote in his despatch to the Admiralty that 'This attack, by a squadron so lately embarked in a new carrier, in unfavourable weather conditions, was magnificently carried out and reflects the greatest credit on all concerned,' adding 'There can be little doubt that the hit was largely responsible for the Bismarck finally being brought to action and sunk,' (although it was another torpedo hit by aircraft of Ark Royal several days later that led to the battleship's final destruction). Esmonde was decorated with the Distinguished Service Order on 11 February 1942 for his leadership and actions (the award was announced on 16 September 1941).

His squadron was serving on  when she was torpedoed in November 1941. Attempts to tow her to Gibraltar were abandoned, and on 14 November 1941 she sank. The Swordfish of the squadron ferried some of the crew off the ship before she sank; Esmonde was mentioned in dispatches for his actions on this occasion.

Channel Dash
Esmonde earned his Victoria Cross when he led his squadron against elements of the German fleet which were making the "Channel Dash" (Operation Cerberus) from Brest in an attempt to return to their home bases at Wilhelmshaven and Kiel through the English Channel. All three had left Brest unopposed, and, with a strong escort of smaller craft and fighter aircraft.

The British had long-anticipated the movement of these ships and had formulated a combined operation of attack by sea, air and land artillery, as the Germans approached the Straits of Dover. The plan was termed Operation Fuller. It was not executed well, principally because the Germans vessels were not detected until they were almost at Dover. Consequently, everything was hurried and poorly coordinated.

Esmonde’s squadron received orders to attack, but no fighter coverage materialised. He waited as long as he felt he could for his escorts to appear, but eventually took off without them. One of the fighter squadrons (10 Supermarine Spitfires of No. 72 Squadron RAF) did rendezvous with Esmonde's squadron; the two squadrons were later attacked by enemy fighters of JG 2 and JG 26 as part of Operation Donnerkeil, the German air superiority plan for the mission. The subsequent fighting left all of the planes in Esmonde's squadron damaged, and caused them to become separated from their fighter escort.

The torpedo bombers continued their attack, in spite of their damage and lack of fighter protection.  There was heavy anti-aircraft fire from the German ships, and Esmonde's aeroplane possibly sustained a direct hit from anti-aircraft fire that destroyed most of one of the port wings of his Swordfish biplane. Esmonde led his flight through a screen of the enemy destroyers and other small vessels protecting the battleships. He was still 2,700 metres from his target when he was hit by a Focke-Wulf Fw 190, resulting in his aircraft bursting into flames and crashing into the sea. The remaining aircraft continued the attack, but all were shot down by enemy fighters; only five of the 18 crew survived the action. The four surviving officers received the Distinguished Service Order, and the enlisted survivor was awarded the Conspicuous Gallantry Medal.

The courage of the Swordfish crews was noted by friend and foe alike. Admiral Bertram Ramsay later wrote, "In my opinion the gallant sortie of these six Swordfish aircraft constitutes one of the finest exhibitions of self-sacrifice and devotion to duty the war had ever witnessed", while Admiral Otto Ciliax in the Scharnhorst described "The mothball attack of a handful of ancient planes, piloted by men whose bravery surpasses any other action by either side that day". As he watched the smoking wrecks of the Swordfish falling into the sea, Captain Hoffmann of the Scharnhorst exclaimed, "Poor fellows, they are so very slow, it is nothing but suicide for them to fly against these big ships". Willhelm Wolf aboard the Scharnhorst wrote, "What an heroic stage for them to meet their end! Behind them their homeland, which they had just left with their hearts steeled to their purpose, still in view".

The award of the VC was gazetted on 3 March 1942, the citation read:

In fact, no torpedo hits were achieved.

Esmonde was remembered in Winston Churchill's famous broadcast speech on 13 May 1945, "Five years of War", as having defended Ireland's honour:

Seven weeks later Lieutenant Commander Esmonde's body, still in his lifejacket, was washed ashore in the Thames Estuary near the River Medway. Esmonde was buried in the Woodlands Cemetery, Gillingham, Kent on 30 April 1942.

His great-uncle Thomas Esmonde, had been awarded the Victoria Cross in the Crimean War.

References

Further reading

External links
 Lieutenant Commander E. Esmonde in The Art of War exhibition at the UK National Archives (includes image of original recommendation for the VC)
 
 Location of grave and VC medal (Kent)
 Esmonde Family Tree 

1909 births
1942 deaths
Burials in Kent
Military personnel from Yorkshire
People from Thurgoland
People from County Tipperary
People educated at Clongowes Wood College
People educated at Wimbledon College
Royal Air Force officers
Royal Navy officers of World War II
British World War II pilots
British World War II bomber pilots
Irish World War II recipients of the Victoria Cross
Companions of the Distinguished Service Order
British World War II recipients of the Victoria Cross
Royal Navy personnel killed in World War II
Aviators killed by being shot down
People who died at sea
Fleet Air Arm aviators
Eugene
Royal Navy recipients of the Victoria Cross
Fleet Air Arm personnel of World War II